State of Decay is the fourth serial of the 18th season in the British science fiction television series Doctor Who, which was first broadcast in four weekly parts on BBC1 from 22 November to 13 December 1980.

State of Decay is the second of three loosely connected serials set in another universe known as E-Space. In the serial, three vampire lords rule over a village deliberately kept at a low development level for a thousand years. The lords intend to revive their giant leader vampire, the "Great One", that converted them from humans after their spaceship crashed on the planet.

Plot
After the events of Full Circle, the Fourth Doctor, Romana, K9, and TARDIS stowaway Adric arrive on a planet with a feudal society whose inhabitants live under the thrall of three lords—Zargo, Camilla, and Aukon—who dwell in a shadowy Tower. The Doctor and Romana discover evidence of advanced technology and wonder what happened to cause the planet to devolve to its current "state of decay". After being taken prisoner by the three lords, The Doctor and Romana discover that the great Tower in which the Lords dwell is a spaceship called Hydrax, originally from Earth. The three lords are members of the original crew, mutated into vampires, while the subjects beneath them are the descendants of the other colonists, made dull and primitive by generations of breeding and oppression. 

A rebel called Tarak infiltrates the Tower, freeing the Doctor and Romana. The Doctor returns to the TARDIS, while Romana stays with Tarak to search for Adric. They find Adric in a state of trance. Zargo and Camilla attack them, but Aukon compels them to stop. He wants Adric as a Chosen One and Romana, a Time Lord, for sacrifice at the Arising, the first taste of revenge for their master, the "Great One."

In the TARDIS the Doctor discovers that the Great Vampires could only be defeated using specially designed ships which fired steel bolts that speared the monsters through the heart. Deep within the tower, he finds the last Great Vampire, about to be revived. The Doctor rigs one of the spaceship's old scout ships to launch and fall back toward the ground, driving itself into the heart of the subterranean Great One. With the Great One dispatched, the three vampire Lords crumble to dust. 

The Doctor finds Romana and Adric and they leave the planet, hoping it will develop once again toward its former advanced state.

Production
Working titles for this story included The Wasting and The Witch Lords. The serial was a re-written version of a story originally entitled The Witch Lords, later retitled The Vampire Mutations, which Dicks had submitted to the series in 1977, but which had been pulled just before production because of fears of a possible conflict with the BBC's Count Dracula, a high-profile adaptation of Bram Stoker's classic novel Dracula. It was replaced by Horror of Fang Rock (1977).

This serial and the following Warriors' Gate featured an improved K9 prop.

Broadcast and reception

For Radio Times, Mark Braxton awarded State of Decay four stars out of five, writing that "Terrance Dicks's penultimate script for Doctor Who positively gushes with invention and wit. In fact, it's among his cleverest, and gives an already striking season 18 a tremendous shot in the arm." He considered it "a throwback to the Hinchcliffe/Holmes golden age, played with a totally straight bat and all the better for it." He regarded it as "gorgeously designed" and the "vampiric triumvirate" as "wonderfully cast", and "one of Tom Baker's finest outings", saying there was an "on-screen rapport" between him and Lalla Ward which was "charming and relaxed". He found some faults, stating that "some effectively chilly location filming at Burnham Beeches notwithstanding, the bats are a bit lame, rendered by stock footage, cut-outs dangled from a string or a tinkling electronic noise. Despite their simmering menace, Aukon, Camilla and Zargo are all threat and no bite, swishing about with some bizarrely stagey movements. And the Great One is a gloved hand." However, he concluded by stating that it was "supremely atmospheric, solid of script and with potent production values." Writing for The Guardian in 2019, Toby Hadoke described it as "a clever meld of vampire legend and science fiction". In Doctor Who: The Complete Guide, Mark Campbell was less impressed, awarding it six out of ten, describing it as a "limply directed vampire tale that doesn't really gel – the horror should be more explicit, the vampirism more obvious. One feels the production team deliberately didn't want to plagiarise Hammer, which, considering the Hammeresque script, seems a mistake."

Commercial releases

In print

A novelisation of this serial, written by Terrance Dicks, was published by W. H. Allen Ltd (hardback) in September 1981, with the paperback from Target Books following in January 1982. A novelisation with different text was written by Dicks for an audiobook read by Tom Baker and released on cassette by Pickwick in June 1981. On 7 January 2016 the full audiobook of the Target novelisation was released read by Geoffrey Beevers and John Leeson.

Home media
State of Decay was released on VHS in October 1997. It was released on DVD in January 2009 as part of a boxed set entitled The E-Space Trilogy. This serial was also released as part of the Doctor Who DVD Files (issue 86) in April 2012. In 2020, it was released as part of the Time Lord Victorious: Road to the Dark Times Blu-ray.

References

External links

Target novelisation

1980 British television episodes
Doctor Who serials novelised by Terrance Dicks
Fourth Doctor serials
Television episodes about vampires